Underground Lovers (sometimes stylised as undergroundLOVERS), are an Australian indie rock and electronic music band. The founding mainstays are Glenn Bennie (guitar, vocals) and Vincent Giarrusso (vocals, guitar, keyboard) who had formed the group as GBVG, in 1988. By May 1990 the duo were renamed as Underground Lovers and joined by Richard Andrew (drums), Maurice Argiro (bass guitar) and Philippa Nihill (vocals, guitar and keyboard).

History

1988-1998  
Underground Lovers' founding mainstays Glenn Bennie and Vincent Giarrusso met in a Melbourne suburban high school during the 1970s. Both were influenced by Joy Division, New Order, the Cure and the local underground electronic and experimental scene. By 1988 they formed a music duo, GBVG, while studying drama at university. They released a single, "Blast", in that year. Australian music journalist, Ed Nimmervoll, opined that "Glenn's striking hypnotic guitar atmospheres balanced against Vince's acute pop sense."

Bennie on guitar and vocals and Giarrusso on vocals, guitar and keyboards formed a pop music group, Underground Lovers, sometimes stylised as undergroundLOVERS, in late 1989 in Melbourne. The name is from an Italian surrealist play. Their first gig, in May 1990, was at the Corner Hotel, Richmond, supporting the Macguffins. The line-up was Bennie, Giarrusso, Richard Andrew on drums, Stephen Downes on bass guitar and Philippa Nihill on vocals, guitar and keyboard; Maurice Argiro (ex-No Nonsense) replaced Downes on bass guitar after that first show. Their first manager Craig Kamber was instrumental in developing and establishing their career, and securing sought after support slots with profile local and international artists in Australia and overseas - such as The Cure, Ride, Lush, My Bloody Valentine and many others.

The members of Underground Lovers funded their self-titled debut album, with Simon Grounds producing; it was released via Shock Records in March 1991. Australian musicologist, Ian McFarlane, described its sonation, "melancholy guitar pop ('Girl Afraid', 'Wasted'), rhythmic dance pop ('Yes I Do', 'Round and Round') and reflective, acoustic folk ('My American Accent')." The first two singles from the album were, "Round and Round" (February) and "Looking for Rain" (April). In November they issued a non-album single, "Lick the Boot", which was their first United Kingdom single.

When the album was released in the UK and United States, markets re-titled it, Get to Notice, after its opening track. For the international version, "Lick the Boot", replaced an album track, "Ascend Up", from the Australian version. By year's end a four-track extended play, Nice, appeared, in addition to "Ripe" on rooArt's Youngblood 3 various artists' compilation album. Beat magazine selected Nice as single of the week, describing it as "pop rich in all the right ingredients" and "awesome".

Bevan Hannan of The Canberra Times felt that "Nice G.I." was the "outstanding cut from their last EP" which dealt with "the early stages of the Gulf War about the commandos orchestrating the bombing of Iraq." Hannan also praised "Ripe" as "by far the best" track on Youngblood 3. At the ARIA Music Awards of 1992 in March the group won Best New Artist for Underground Lovers; it was also nominated for Best Independent Release.

In January 1992 they entered the studio where Bennie and Giarrusso co-produced their second album, Leaves Me Blind with Wayne Connolly (of the Welcome Mat). It was a more layered and experimental work. The album came out first in the UK, in August, through the short-lived 4AD imprint, Guernica. By that stage Polydor had signed the group in Australia, and released Leaves Me Blind locally, in December. Mathieson described how "they were so far ahead of their contemporaries that they passed over the horizon, borne on a rolling sea of sound that would become their signature."

Underground Lovers supported the Cure (in August 1992) and My Bloody Valentine on their respective Australian tours of that year. The album provided three singles, "Ladies Choice" (August) "I Was Right" (November) and "Your Eyes" (August 1993). Mathieson found that the latter track was a "telling example of their refusal to be contained... The focus is on the bedroom, one person looking into the eyes of another, as the bassline dips and rises like a heart beginning to race with excitement."

Following a tour of the UK and North America for the first half of 1993, the Underground Lovers enlisted Melburnian electronic producers David Chesworth and Robert Goodge (both ex-Essendon Airport) for their third album, Dream It Down (June 1994). McFarlane noticed that it was "lush and atmospheric." It reached the top 60 on the ARIA Albums Chart. Ahead of the album, Richard Andrew was replaced on drums by Derek Yuen.

Dream It Down provided two singles, "Las Vegas" (May 1994) and "Losin' It" (August). The latter received high rotation on national youth radio, Triple J, it reached the ARIA Singles Chart top 100 and was listed on the Triple J Hottest 100, 1994 at No. 19. The band quit Polydor in 1995 and, in a quest for more artistic freedom, set up their own Mainstream label (in conjunction with the big-league indie, Rubber Records).

Also produced by Wayne Connolly, Rushall Station, which was released in April 1996, was their most 'bare bones' recording since their debut. Philippa Nihill left the band during the recording of the album (though she recorded vocals for two tracks). The band subsequently received a nomination for Best Independent Release at the 1997 ARIA Awards. Also in 1997 Giarusso and Bennie put out the debut album by their experimental side-project GBVG, titled Whitey Trickstar, in addition to the fifth Underground Lovers album Ways T'Burn. The latter saw a move towards more electronic territory. Drummer Derek Yuen departed the band during the "Ways T'Burn" recording sessions, Autohaze drummer Andrew Nunns filled the drum stool for future touring and recording duties.

Giarrusso and Bennie maintained a low profile for much of 1998, though they did release another GBVG project - a cover of Can's "I Want More". The vocals were credited to a made-up Japanese chanteuse named Mitsuame, who in reality was Triple J and Recovery co-host Jane Gazzo. Maurice Argiro left the band at the end of 1998. Emma Bortignon came on board as bass player and the Underground lovers readied their sixth album Cold Feeling.

1999-present 
Cold Feeling was the Underground Lovers' most electronic-influenced album to date. It also featured minor contributions from The Paradise Motel's Mérida Sussex, and ex-Triffids pedal steel guitarist Graham Lee, among other Melburnian indie musicians. The title track received considerable airplay on Triple J.

Following Cold Feeling, Giarrusso concentrated mainly on finalising his feature film debut Mallboy, which he wrote and directed, and starred Kane McNay of SeaChange fame. Inspired by Giarrusso's work as a social worker, the film focused on a troubled youth and his dysfunctional lifestyle in Melbourne's northern suburbs. The film premiered at the 2000 Cannes Film Festival where it was selected for the highly prestigious Director's Fortnight (at the time only the fifth Australian film to have been selected). It later premiered in Australia at the 2001 Melbourne International Film Festival as closing night film and had a limited release in cinemas soon after (through Buena Vista International). McNay won an AFI Award (Best Actor) for his performance.  Giarrusso and Bennie composed and recorded the score for Mallboy, which came out as the unofficial seventh Underground Lovers album in 2001. Further live activity was undertaken that year, to preview newer material - none of which has been recorded or released.

Underground Lovers played shows supporting New Order during their Australian tour in January 2002 before taking an extended break.

It was announced in July 2009 that the "classic" early 1990s lineup of Underground Lovers would reform for an appearance at the Homebake Festival in Sydney on 5 December. In conjunction with the reunion, Rubber Records re-released Underground Lovers' 1990 self-titled album and post-1996 output digitally on iTunes that November. A 'secret' warm-up show was performed on 1 November at Melbourne's The Toff in Town. Well-received club shows in Sydney and Melbourne were also performed in December.

In October 2010, Mathieson and fellow music writers and critics John O'Donnell and Toby Creswell listed Leaves Me Blind as the 54th greatest Australian album in their book, 100 Best Australian Albums. The band supported Primal Scream for their Melbourne shows in February 2011 and also supported Mark Gardener (formerly of Ride) on his Australian tour in 2012.

Underground Lovers seventh album, Weekend was released in April 2013. It features the energetic rock stylings and elements of electronica that are now a signature of the band. 'Weekend' was created with longtime collaborators Wayne Connolly (recording engineer) Tim Whitten (mix engineer ), Don Bartley ( mastering) and a new addition to the production crew, Tim Prince (recording engineer).

Related projects
Glenn Bennie has an ongoing solo project named GB3. Rubber Records released the first GB3 album Circlework in October 2003, which was a collaboration with Philippa Nihill.

The second GB3 album Emptiness Is Our Business was issued in August 2006. The collaborators on the album were Sarah Blasko, Steve Kilbey, Philippa Nihill, Grant McLennan of the Go Betweens, ex-Frente! vocalist Angie Hart, Sianna Lee from Love Outside Andromeda, Stephen Cummings, and Adalita from Magic Dirt amongst others.

A third GB3 album, Damaged/Controlled, released in 2010, was largely co-written and recorded with Steve Kilbey. Philippa Nihill provided vocals for the track "Nectarine", which was also accompanied by an animated video created by Maurice Argiro.

Throughout the 2000s, Giarrusso started developing a number of film and music projects with funding from private and government bodies including Godless, a feature film that was originally slated for production in 2007. That year he also re-emerged under the moniker Mist and Sea - predominantly a recording project in collaboration with Jason Sweeney and Cailan Burns of Pretty Boy Crossover. Their first album Unless was released by Popfrenzy Records in July 2007. Giarrusso also performed live around that time with a new band called Raining Ropes, featuring former members of Bergerac and The Paradise Motel. However, these projects have since remained dormant.

In 2009 Giarrusso performed a couple of shows in Melbourne as Underground Lovers in LA, backed by bassist Todd Hutchinson (Tim Steward Band), as well as cellist/keyboardist Zoe Barry, guitarist Jed Palmer and drummer Steve Griffiths from the Hope Diamond. Both sets consisted of a selection of Underground Lovers songs.

After officially leaving Underground Lovers in 1996, Philippa Nihill released the Dead Sad EP in November 1996, a full-length album A Little Easy in 2000. She also collaborated with Australian singer and film maker Paula Kehoe on the Saoi CD This Drowning Is Dreaming in December 2006. Nihill will release a new solo album, Find Her Way, in 2022.

Members 
Current Members
 Glenn Bennie - guitar, vocals (1988-2002, 2009–Present)
 Vincent Giarrusso - vocals, guitar, keyboard (1988-2002, 2009–Present)
 Philippa Nihill - vocals, guitar and keyboard (1989-1996, 2009–Present)
 Richard Andrew - drums (1990-1994, 2009–Present)
 Maurice Argiro - bass guitar (1990-1998, 2009–Present)
 Emma Bortignon - bass (1998-2002, 2009–Present)

Past Members
 Stephen Downes - bass (1990)
 Derek J. Yuen - drums (1994-1997)
 Andrew Nunns - drums (1997-2002)

Discography

Studio albums

Collaborative albums 

 Note: GBVG was the collaborative partnership between Glenn Bennie and Vincent Giarrusso of the Underground Lovers.

Compilation albums

Charting singles

Other appearances 
 "Ripe" on Young Blood 3(rooArt, 1991)
 "I'll Be Your Mirror" on The Velvet Down Underground(Birdland, 1992)
 "Get to Notice" on Screaming at the Mirror Three (Giggle Records, 1992)

Awards and nominations

APRA Awards
The APRA Awards are presented annually from 1982 by the Australasian Performing Right Association (APRA), "honouring composers and songwriters". They commenced in 1982.

! 
|-
| 2020 
| "Seven Day Weekend" (Richard Andrew / Maurice Argiro / Glenn Bennie / Vincent Giarrusso / Phillipa Nihill)
| Song of the Year
| 
| 
|-

ARIA Music Awards
The ARIA Music Awards is an annual awards ceremony that recognises excellence, innovation, and achievement across all genres of Australian music. They commenced in 1987. Underground Lovers won one award.

! 
|-
| rowspan="2"| 1992
| rowspan="2"| Underground Lovers
| ARIA Award for Best New Talent
| 
| rowspan="2"| 
|-
| ARIA Award for Best Independent Release
| 
|-
| 1996
| Rushall Station
| Best Independent Release
|

References

General
 
Specific

External links
 World Socialist Web Site: The atmospheric music of Underground Lovers
 Australian Music Online: "Underground Lovers"
 Raining Ropes on MySpace

4AD artists
ARIA Award winners
Australian indie rock groups
Musical groups established in 1988
Musical groups disestablished in 2002
Musical groups reestablished in 2009
Victoria (Australia) musical groups
Musical groups from Melbourne